Stuttgarter Kickers is a German association football club that plays in Stuttgart, Baden-Württemberg, founded on 21 September 1899 as FC Stuttgarter Cickers.

History
In its early years the club had a decent local squad that played in the Südkreis-Liga, Kreisliga Württemberg and then in the Bezirksliga Württemberg. With the reorganization of German football during the Third Reich in 1933, the team – now known as SV Stuttgarter Kickers – found itself in the Gauliga Württemberg, one of sixteen top tier regional leagues established in the country during that time. It continued to have good results locally, but was unable to impress beyond its own area. In the final year of World War II the Kickers fielded a combined wartime squad with Sportfreunde Stuttgart.

After the war the club resumed play in the Oberliga Süd and performed as a mid-table team early on.  By 1950 it had slipped to the lower half of the table with a seemingly solid grip in 14th place, constantly struggling to avoid relegation throughout the decade. Kickers spent the early 60s in tier II football, but after the formation of the Bundesliga, Germany's new professional league, in 1963, the club was moved to the Regionalliga Süd. In 1974, that league went professional and became the 2. Bundesliga. Between 1963 and the late 1980s the team had varying results, but finally stabilized in the upper half of the standings toward the end of that period. It has one losing appearance to its credit in the DFB-Pokal in 1987 and in 1988–89 it made it to the Bundesliga for the first time. It ended a run of 28 years as a second division outfit. The team was immediately relegated after a 17th-place finish, but continued to deliver some of its best performances. Die Blauen advanced to the semi-finals of the 2000 DFB-Pokal and then had a second turn in the Bundesliga in 1991–92, but with the same result as its earlier time up. Over the next decade the club played largely in the second division, before slipping to the Regionalliga Süd (III) in 2001, where they remained until 2008, when a tenth-place finish narrowly qualified them for the new 3. Liga. They finished last (20th) in the 3. Liga in 2008–09 and were relegated to the Regionalliga Süd. After three seasons at Regionalliga level, the Kickers returned to the 3. Liga in 2012 where they played for four seasons until relegation at the end of 2015–16, now dropping down to the Regionalliga Südwest. In 2018 they were relegated once more to the Oberliga Baden-Württemberg.

Other departments
The Stuttgarter Kickers also have handball, athletics, table tennis, cheerleading, and lacrosse departments. The association is also recognized for its training of football referees and other game officials. They had a field hockey department too, which in 1957 became independent under the name of HTC Stuttgarter Kickers.

Players

Current squad

Out on loan

Current staff

Reserve team

The Stuttgarter Kickers II, historically also known as Stuttgarter Kickers Amateure, have been playing in the Oberliga Baden-Württemberg since 2000. Previously, the team fluctuated between the Landesliga and Verbandsliga Württemberg.

The reserve team squad:

Staff
 Dieter Märkle (head coach)
 Danijel Baric (assistant coach)
 Erol Sabanov (goalkeeper coach)
 Ümit Sahin (goalkeeper coach)
 Jan Mayer (fitness coach)

Honours
The club's honours:

League
 German football championship
 Runners-up: 1908
 Southern German championship
 Champions: 1908, 1913, 1917
 Südkreis-Liga (I)
 Champions: 1913, 1914, 1917
 Kreisliga Württemberg (I)
 Champions: 1921, 1923
 Bezirksliga Württemberg-Baden (I)
 Champions: 1924, 1925
 Bezirksliga Württemberg (I)
 Champions: 1928, 1933
 Runners-up: 1929
 Gauliga Württemberg (I)
 Champions: 1936, 1939, 1940, 1941, 1942
 2nd Oberliga Süd (II)
 Champions: 1951, 1959
 2nd Bundesliga (II)
 Champions: 1988
 Regionalliga Süd (III/IV)
 Champions: 1996, 2012
 Runners-up: 1995, 2011

Cup
 DFB-Pokal
 Runners-up: 1987
 Württemberg Cup (Tiers III-VII)
 Winners: 2005, 2006, 2022
 Runners-up: 2003, 2014, 2017

Youth
The club's youth teams have enjoyed quite a bit of success on the national scene.
 German Under 19 championship
 Champions: 1979
 German Junior Cup
 Winners: 1990
 ‡ Reserve team.

Recent seasons
The recent season-by-season performance of the club:

Stuttgarter Kickers

Stuttgarter Kickers II

With the introduction of the Regionalligas in 1994 and the 3. Liga in 2008 as the new third tier, below the 2. Bundesliga, all leagues below dropped one tier.

Key

Presidential history
The club's presidents:

 1900–1900 Hans Schröder
 1900–1900 Hans Spandau
 1900–1901 Gustav Dreher
 1901–1902 Richard Dürr
 1902–1904 Viktor Mäulen
 1904–1905 Gustav Dreher
 1905–1908 Alfred Hezel
 1908–1911 Hans Trapp
 1911–1912 Anton Salg
 1912–1919 Hans Trapp
 1919–1921 Albert Mann
 1921–1926 Friedrich Häussermann
 1927–1929 Max Maurer
 1929–1934 Gotthilf Waizenegger
 1934–1937 Karl Umgelter
 1937–1945 Hermann Kurz
 1945–1948 Eugen Grau
 1948–1950 Richard "Molly" Schauffele
 1950–1951 Max Maurer
 1951–1952 Wilhelm Reuter
 1952–1955 Dr. Erich Häussermann
 1955–1957 Erich Scriba
 1957–1957 Philipp Metzler
 1957–1958 Hermann Ulrich
 1958–1960 Albrecht Brunst
 1960–1960 Willi Knörzer
 1960–1962 Albrecht Brunst
 1962–1963 Gottfried Sälzer
 1963–1967 Helmuth Bauer
 1967–1979 Walter Queissner
 1979–2003 Axel Dünnwald-Metzler
 07/2003 – 03/2007 Hans Kullen
 03/2007 – 07/2009 Dirk Eichelbaum
 07/2009 – 11/2010 Edgar Kurz
 since 12 January 2010 Prof. Dr. Rainer Lorz

Coaching history
The club's coaches:

 07.01.1945 – 06.30.1946 Ossi Müller
 07.01.1946 – 06.30.1947 Albert Cozza
 07.01.1947 – 06.30.1948 Albert Cozza, Josef "Seppl" Müller and Lory Polster
 07.01.1948 – 06.30.1950 Emil Melcher
 07.01.1950 – 06.30.1951 Kuno Krügel
 07.01.1951 – 06.30.1952 Fritz Kerr
 07.01.1952 – 06.30.1953 Kuno Krügel
 07.01.1953 – 06.30.1954 Eduard Havlicek
 07.01.1954 – 06.30.1956 Georg Bayerer
 07.01.1956 – 06.30.1958 Oswald Pfau
 07.01.1958 – 06.30.1960 Benda Hügel
 07.01.1960 – 06.30.1962 Karl-Heinz Grindler
 07.01.1961 – 04.30.1962 Jenö Csaknady
 05.01.1962 – 06.30.1962 Albert Sing
 07.01.1962 – 06.30.1966 Hans Eberle
 07.01.1966 – 06.30.1969 Georg Wurzer
 07.01.1969 – 11.30.1969 Gerd Menne
 12.01.1969 – 06.30.1971 Georg Wurzer
 07.01.1971 – 06.30.1972 Barthel Thomas
 07.01.1972 – 06.30.1973 Willibald Hahn
 07.01.1973 – 09.15.1974 Fritz Millinger
 09.16.1974 – 06.30.1975 Georg Wurzer and Rudolf Kröner
 07.01.1975 – 06.30.1977 Rudolf Kröner
 07.01.1977 – 06.30.1978 Hans Cieslarczyk
 07.01.1978 – 10.26.1980 Hans-Dieter Roos
 10.27.1981 – 06.30.1982 Slobodan Cendic
 07.01.1982 – 01.23.1983 Jürgen Sundermann
 01.24.1983 – 10.21.1984 Horst Buhtz
 10.22.1984 – 06.30.1987 Dieter Renner
 07.01.1987 – 05.02.1990 Manfred Krafft
 05.02.1990 – 06.30.1992 Rainer Zobel
 07.01.1992 – 08.23.1992 Frieder Schömezler
 08.25.1992 – 06.30.1993 Rolf Schafstall
 07.01.1993 – 02.28.1994 Lorenz-Günther Köstner
 03.01.1994 – 06.30.1994 Günter Sebert
 07.01.1994 – 10.26.1994 Paul Sauter
 10.26.1994 – 02.18.1998 Wolfgang Wolf
 02.18.1998 – 02.24.1998 Frieder Schömezler
 02.25.1998 – 05.17.1999 Paul Linz
 05.18.1999 – 06.30.1999 Ralf Vollmer
 07.01.1999 – 03.28.2000 Michael Feichtenbeiner
 03.30.2000 – 06.30.2000 Dragoslav Stepanović
 07.01.2000 – 09.25.2000 Hans-Jürgen Boysen
 09.27.2000 – 08.26.2001 Rainer Zobel
 08.27.2001 – 03.09.2003 Marcus Sorg
 03.10.2001 – 10.27.2003 Rainer Adrion
 10.27.2003 – 06.30.2007 Robin Dutt
 07.01.2007 – 11.04.2007 Peter Zeidler
 11.05.2007 – 09.21.2008 Stefan Minkwitz
 09.21.2008 – 04.14.2009 Edgar Schmitt
 04.14.2009 – 06.30.2009 Rainer Kraft
 07.01.2009 – 11.19.2012 Dirk Schuster
 11.19.2012 – 12.19.2012 Guido Buchwald (interim)
 12.19.2012 – 04.07.2013 Gerd Dais
 04.07.2013 – 09.09.2013 Massimo Morales
 09.09.2013 – 09.30.2013 Jürgen Hartmann (interim)
 09.30.2013 – 11.04.2015 Horst Steffen
 11.04.2015 – 11.08.2015 Alfred Kaminski (interim)
 11.09.2015 – 06.30.2016 Tomislav Stipić
 07.01.2016 – 10.24.2016 Alfred Kaminski
 11.04.2015 – 12.31.2016 Dieter Märkle (interim)
 01.01.2017 – 16.10.2017 Tomasz Kaczmarek
 17.10.2017 – 05.04.2018 Paco Vaz
 09.04.2018 – 30.06.2018 Jürgen Seeberger
 01.07.2018 – 30.06.2019 Tobias Flitsch
 01.07.2019 – 27.09.2021 Ramon Gehrmann
 27.09.2021 –  Mustafa Ünal

References

External links

Official website 
The Abseits Guide to German Soccer
Stuttgarter Kickers at Weltfussball.de 
Stuttgarter Kickers II at Weltfussball.de 
Das deutsche Fußball-Archiv historical German domestic league tables 

 
Football clubs in Germany
Football clubs in Baden-Württemberg
Association football clubs established in 1899
1899 establishments in Germany
Football in Stuttgart
Bundesliga clubs
2. Bundesliga clubs
3. Liga clubs